The Ecclesiastical Province of Canada, founded in 1860, forms one of four ecclesiastical provinces in the Anglican Church of Canada. Despite modern use of the name Canada, the ecclesiastical province covers only the former territory of Lower Canada (i.e., southern and eastern Quebec), the Maritimes, and Newfoundland and Labrador (The Ecclesiastical Province of Ontario split off as a separate entity in 1913.) The province comprises seven dioceses:

  Montreal (within the secular Canadian province of Quebec)
  Quebec (whose borders are consistent with Lower Canada outside Montreal)
  Fredericton (New Brunswick)
  Nova Scotia and Prince Edward Island (Nova Scotia and Prince Edward Island)
  Western Newfoundland (Newfoundland and Labrador)
  Central Newfoundland (Newfoundland and Labrador)
  Eastern Newfoundland and Labrador (Newfoundland and Labrador)

A  Metropolitan, elected from among the province's diocesan bishops, heads each province of the Anglican Church of Canada. On election, this bishop then becomes Archbishop of his or her diocese and Metropolitan of the Province.  David Edwards, the Bishop of Fredericton, became the Metropolitan of the Province of Canada in 2020.

From 1861 until 1870 the Bishop of Montreal served as metropolitan over the four dioceses of the then Province of Canada (i.e., Upper and Lower Canada - modern Ontario and Quebec). The Province expanded in 1870 and 1871 to include New Brunswick and Nova Scotia. After 1878 the role of metropolitan of the province of Canada became one elected from among the diocesan bishops of the Province.

Metropolitans of Canada

See also
Ecclesiastical provinces of the Anglican Church of Canada
List of dioceses of the Anglican Church of Canada

References

External links
The province's website

 
Canada
Canada, Ecclesiastical Province of
Religious organizations established in 1860
1860 establishments in Canada